Joseph Louis LaBracio (September 5, 1932 – April 21, 2021), known professionally as Joe Long, was an American musician best known as the bass guitarist for the Four Seasons.

Life and career
Long was a classically trained musician who studied with Alfonse Strazza, the principal bassist for the New York Philharmonic. However, a severe hand injury forced Joe to give up the rigors of playing classical bass and switch to the Fender bass guitar. He then began listening more to rock and roll music and became a bass player for several local New Jersey rock bands before joining the Four Seasons in 1965 as a replacement for Charles Calello, who temporarily replaced Nick Massi. Long continued to record, perform and tour with The Four Seasons through the mid-1970s. 

After leaving the group, Long formed the rock 'n roll group LaBracio and later the jazz band Jersey Bounce. In a 2007 interview, Long stated "I still play an occasional gig. And, I have done a few recording sessions with Tommy (DeVito). For the most part, though, I am retired."

Long died from complications of COVID-19 on April 21, 2021, during the COVID-19 pandemic in New Jersey.

References

External links
 
 
 Joe Long Tribute Evening, Baldoria's, New York City 5/28/06
 Interview: Joe Long: His Story
 The Jersey Boys 2006 Tony Award Winner for Best Musical
 Jersey Boys Blog Exclusive Interview 11/20/07 (Part1)
 Jersey Boys Blog Exclusive Interview 11/20/07 (Part3)

1932 births
2021 deaths
20th-century American bass guitarists
20th-century American male musicians
American male bass guitarists
American rock bass guitarists
American people of Italian descent
The Four Seasons (band) members
Guitarists from New Jersey
Jersey Shore musicians
People from Elizabeth, New Jersey
Deaths from the COVID-19 pandemic in New Jersey